Bohdan Sláma (born 29 May 1967 in Opava) is a Czech film director. He studied at the Film and Television Faculty of the Academy of Performing Arts in Prague (FAMU).

Filmography

External links
 

1967 births
Living people
People from Opava
Czech film directors